Aurora is a studio album by French jazz fusion artist Jean-Luc Ponty, released in 1976. It features guitarist Daryl Stuermer (later to join  Genesis), keyboardist Patrice Rushen, bassist  Tom Fowler (with whom Ponty had played with Frank Zappa), and drummer Norman Fearrington. It was reissued on audio cassette in 1990 and on CD in 1992.

Track listing 
All tracks written by Jean-Luc Ponty.

 "Is Once Enough?" – 4:58
 "Renaissance" – 5:48
 "Aurora, Pt. 1" – 2:46
 "Aurora, Pt. 2" – 6:15
 "Passenger of the Dark" – 4:17
 "Lost Forest" – 5:27
 "Between You and Me" – 5:58
 "Waking Dream" – 2:25

Personnel 
 Jean-Luc Ponty – acoustic & electric violin, violectra, autoharp, keyboards
 Daryl Stuermer – acoustic & electric guitars
 Patrice Rushen – acoustic & electric piano, synthesizer
 Tom Fowler – electric bass
 Norman Fearrington – drums, percussion

Production
 Jean-Luc Ponty – producer
 Larry Hirsch – engineer, mixing
 George Putko – engineer, studio assistant
 Zal Schreiber – mastering
 Jim Marshall – photography
 Jean-Paul Oren – photography
 Phil A. Ceccola – cover photo

Charts

References

External links 
 Official artist website www.Ponty.com
 Official record label website AtlanticRecords.com
 Jean-Luc Ponty - Aurora (1976) album review by Scott Yanow, credits & releases at AllMusic
 Jean-Luc Ponty - Aurora (1976) album releases & credits at Discogs
 Jean-Luc Ponty - Aurora (1976) album to be listened as stream on Spotify

Jean-Luc Ponty albums
1975 albums
Atlantic Records albums